Chuanminshen violaceus is a species of flowering plant in the Apiaceae, of the monotypic genus Chuanminshen. It is endemic to China.

References

Endemic flora of China
Apioideae
Monotypic Apioideae genera